The City of Kalamunda is a local government area in the eastern metropolitan region of the Western Australian capital city of Perth about  east of Perth's central business district. In the mid 2010s, the area had a population of 57 thousand people.

History
The Darling Range Road District was gazetted on 30 April 1897. On 1 July 1961, it became the Shire of Kalamunda after the enactment of the Local Government Act 1960, which reformed all remaining road districts into shires. The Shire of Kalamunda commenced community consultation on whether to become a city in 2015, and was renamed the City of Kalamunda on 1 July 2017.

Wards
The city is divided into four wards.

 North Ward (three councillors)
 North West Ward (three councillors)
 South East Ward (three councillors)
 South West Ward (three councillors)

Suburbs
The suburbs of the City of Kalamunda with population and size figures based on the most recent Australian census:

( * indicates suburb partially located within City)

Population

Heritage listed places

As of 2023, 259 places are heritage-listed in the City of Kalamunda, of which 17 are on the State Register of Heritage Places, among them Perth Observatory and the Statham's Quarry.

References

External links
 

 
Kalamunda